North Auburn is a census-designated place (CDP) in Placer County, California, United States. It is part of the Sacramento–Arden-Arcade–Roseville Metropolitan Statistical Area. The population was 13,452 at the 2020 census.

Geography

Climate
According to the Köppen Climate Classification system, North Auburn has a warm-summer Mediterranean climate, abbreviated "Csa" on climate maps.

Demographics

2010
At the 2010 census North Auburn had a population of 13,022. The racial makeup of North Auburn was 11,081 (85.1%) White, 115 (0.9%) African American, 172 (1.3%) Native American, 298 (2.3%) Asian, 13 (0.1%) Pacific Islander, 893 (6.9%) from other races, and 450 (3.5%) from two or more races. Hispanic or Latino of any race were 2,108 persons (16.2%).

The census reported that 11,999 people (92.1% of the population) lived in households, 308 (2.4%) lived in non-institutionalized group quarters, and 715 (5.5%) were institutionalized.

There were 5,080 households, 1,440 (28.3%) had children under the age of 18 living in them, 2,254 (44.4%) were opposite-sex married couples living together, 598 (11.8%) had a female householder with no husband present, 238 (4.7%) had a male householder with no wife present.  There were 312 (6.1%) unmarried opposite-sex partnerships, and 24 (0.5%) same-sex married couples or partnerships. 1,657 households (32.6%) were one person and 978 (19.3%) had someone living alone who was 65 or older. The average household size was 2.36.  There were 3,090 families (60.8% of households); the average family size was 2.97.

The age distribution was 2,732 people (21.0%) under the age of 18, 1,125 people (8.6%) aged 18 to 24, 2,988 people (22.9%) aged 25 to 44, 3,535 people (27.1%) aged 45 to 64, and 2,642 people (20.3%) who were 65 or older.  The median age was 42.5 years. For every 100 females, there were 93.2 males.  For every 100 females age 18 and over, there were 92.7 males.

There were 5,539 housing units at an average density of 710.0 per square mile, of the occupied units 3,092 (60.9%) were owner-occupied and 1,988 (39.1%) were rented. The homeowner vacancy rate was 2.9%; the rental vacancy rate was 10.1%.  6,869 people (52.7% of the population) lived in owner-occupied housing units and 5,130 people (39.4%) lived in rental housing units.

2000
At the 2000 census there were 11,847 people, 4,817 households, and 2,991 families in the CDP. The racial makeup of the CDP was 89.74% White, 0.71% African American, 1.17% Native American, 1.79% Asian, 0.09% Pacific Islander, 3.73% from other races, and 2.76% from two or more races. Hispanic or Latino of any race were 9.21%.

Of the 4,817 households 28.0% had children under the age of 18 living with them, 45.3% were married couples living together, 12.7% had a female householder with no husband present, and 37.9% were non-families. 31.7% of households were one person and 17.9% were one person aged 65 or older.  The average household size was 2.32 and the average family size was 2.90.

The age distribution was 22.3% under the age of 18, 8.1% from 18 to 24, 25.7% from 25 to 44, 22.5% from 45 to 64, and 21.4% 65 or older.  The median age was 41 years. For every 100 females, there were 90.4 males.  For every 100 females age 18 and over, there were 86.9 males.

The median household income was $37,493 and the median family income  was $46,418. Males had a median income of $37,673 versus $26,789 for females. The per capita income for the CDP was $22,091.  About 7.0% of families and 9.4% of the population were below the poverty line, including 14.7% of those under age 18 and 3.0% of those age 65 or over.

References

External links
Auburn, CA Online Community

Census-designated places in Placer County, California
Auburn, California
Census-designated places in California